Lethrinops oculatus is a species of cichlid endemic to Lake Malawi where it is only known from the southern part of the lake over sandy substrates.  This species grows to a length of  TL.  It can also be found in the aquarium trade. The 2018 version of The IUCN Red List of Threatened Species treats this taxon as a junior synonyms of Lethrinops marginatus, as does the Catalog of Fishes.

References

oculatus
Fish of Lake Malawi
Fish of Malawi
Fish described in 1931
Taxa named by Ethelwynn Trewavas
Taxobox binomials not recognized by IUCN
Taxonomy articles created by Polbot